Stairway to Heaven is a 2009 Philippine television drama romance series broadcast by GMA Network. The series is based on a 2003 South Korean television series of the same title. It premiered on the network's Telebabad line up from September 14, 2009 to December 11, 2009, replacing Adik Sa'Yo.

Mega Manila ratings are provided by AGB Nielsen Philippines.

Series overview

Episodes

September 2009

October 2009

November 2009

December 2009

References

Lists of Philippine drama television series episodes